Inga striata is a perennial tree species and is a member of the family Fabaceae. This species occurs in countries like Bolivia, Brazil, Colombia, Ecuador, Guyana, Peru, Suriname and the territory of French Guiana.

The IUCN lists the species as least concern.

Trees can grow up to 20 m. Inga striata have less stomatal conductance and transpiration in soil polluted with clomazone.

References

striata